This is a list of vessels that have served with any of the subsidiaries that make up P&O Ferries.

PandO